The Wallace Adams Service Station is a historic automotive service facility at 523 East 3rd Street in Texarkana, Arkansas.  It is a single-story brick building with flat roof, with a covered service bay projecting from the front, supported by brick columns.  It was built c. 1929, and is the only surviving service station of its period in the city.  Wallace Adams, the proprietor, lived in a house (now demolished) that stood next door.

The property was listed on the National Register of Historic Places in 2008.

See also
National Register of Historic Places listings in Miller County, Arkansas

References

Gas stations on the National Register of Historic Places in Arkansas
Buildings and structures completed in 1929
Buildings and structures in Texarkana, Arkansas
Buildings designated early commercial in the National Register of Historic Places
National Register of Historic Places in Miller County, Arkansas